On 2 March 2023, the Russian authorities said that an armed Ukrainian group crossed the border and attacked the villages of Lyubechane and Sushany, in Bryansk Oblast. Russia said the attackers fired on a car, killing two civilians, before the Federal Security Service forced them back into Ukraine. The Russian Volunteer Corps—reportedly an armed group of Russian far-right anti-government volunteers fighting for Ukraine 
—claimed responsibility. Russia called the incident a terrorist attack, and said its 9th March missile strikes on Ukraine were retaliation. Ukraine's government denied involvement; it said the incident could have been a false-flag attack by Russia to justify its ongoing war against Ukraine, or else an attack by anti-government partisans from within Russia.

Background 

In early February 2023, Bryansk Oblast authorities claimed that they have been strengthening the border with Ukraine. The Governor of Bryansk Oblast Alexander Bogomaz posted photos from a meeting with "commanders of the group protecting the border" on his Telegram channel, and stated that "the work done on the construction of protective structures and strongpoints was highly appreciated by the command of the Russian Armed Forces."

Attack

Initial Russian reports 
On 2 March 2023, at around 11:30 MSK, Bogomaz reported that a Ukrainian sabotage and reconnaissance group made an incursion into Russian territory, entering the village of Lyubechane, Klimovsky District. According to him, the saboteurs fired at a moving car, killing one adult and leaving one child injured. It was reported that the passenger car transported children to a class. Subsequent to this initial report, TASS reported, citing a law enforcement source, that the group had penetrated into two villages, Lubechane and Sushany, and took several residents hostage. According to RFE/RL, a Russian Telegram channel posting local news reported that residents in the area heard explosions and gunfire.

According to TASS, "members of the Rosgvardia entered into a clash with the militants". At 14:30, TASS, citing eyewitnesses, wrote that the "Ukrainian saboteurs" had ceased showing signs of activity and may have left Russian territory. "There is no one from the Ukrainian group on the territory of the Russian Federation, they all left. Now there is a search, possibly, for the remaining fighters of the VSU on our territory", said one of the agency's sources.

Official Russian account 
The Russian government said that a Ukrainian sabotage group entered the Russian village of Lyubechane and fired on civilians in a car.  The Governor of Bryansk Oblast, Alexander Bogomaz, said two civilians were killed and an 11-year-old boy was wounded.

Russia's Federal Security Service (FSB) said it acted together with the Russian military to "eliminate armed Ukrainian nationalists who violated the state border". It later said that the attackers had been pushed back into Ukraine "where a massive artillery strike was inflicted on them". According to FSB, a large number of explosive devices had been found and demining was underway. The FSB did not mention the earlier report about a hostage-taking.

Claim of responsibility 

Responsibility for the attack was claimed by the Russian Volunteer Corps (RDK), an armed group of far-right anti-government Russian nationalists fighting for Ukraine.

Two videos posted online on 2 March show armed men in combat gear calling themselves the Russian Volunteer Corps. They say they crossed the border to fight "the bloody Putinite and Kremlin regime". Describing themselves as Russian "liberators", they called upon citizens to revolt against the government, and denied firing on civilians. One of the videos seems to have been filmed outside Lyubechane medical clinic. According to an analysis by the American think tank Institute for the Study of War, social media users geolocated one of the two videos to Sushany.

RDK's leader Denis Nikitin said that the aim was to expose how weakly guarded Russia's border areas are and to inspire armed opposition against "Kremlin usurpers". According to him, the 45-strong attacking force included anti-government insurgents based in Russia, and acted with Ukraine's backing. On the day of the attack, Russian investigative journalism website iStories published an RDK member's account of the event; he said: "There were 45 of us on that mission. We went in, filmed, ambushed two BMPs. I didn't see any children injured. But there was one injured border guard. No hostages were taken."

Aftermath

Russian reactions 
The President of Russia, Vladimir Putin, said in a televised address that Ukrainian neo-Nazi "terrorists" crossed the border and targeted civilians. Putin said the attack confirmed that Russia did the right thing by invading Ukraine. "They won't achieve anything. We will crush them," Putin said, claiming the group consisted of people who wanted to strip Russia of its history and language. Russia officially treats the event as an act of terrorism, and the Investigative Committee of the Russian Federation has initiated a terrorism probe.

On 9 March, Russia carried out a major missile strike (calling it a "massive retaliatory strike") in response, hitting Ukrainian infrastructure with some of the 80 missiles fired, six of them being Kinzhal supersonic missiles. At least nine people were killed.

Ukrainian reactions 
The Ukrainian government and military denied carrying out a cross-border attack, and suggested Russia could use the allegations to justify further attacks on Ukraine.

Mykhailo Podolyak, adviser to the President of Ukraine, wrote on Twitter: "The story of a Ukrainian sabotage group in the Russian Federation is a classic deliberate provocation". He said Russia "wants to scare its people to justify attacking another country and growing poverty after a year of war." He told the Associated Press: "This was done by the Russians; Ukraine has nothing to do with it". Podolyak suggested the attack could have been carried out by an anti-government group within Russia, saying: "The partisan movement in the Russian Federation is getting stronger and more aggressive".

According to a report by the The New York Times, "Ukraine intelligence officials have tried to portray the incident as evidence of Russian divisions"; Andriy Cherniak, a representative of the Ukrainian Main Directorate of Intelligence (GUR) was cited as saying: "This is a sign that Russia can no longer function normally and this leads to internal destruction". Separately, he noted that the Russian Volunteer Corps claimed responsibility, and indicated that Ukraine was not involved. , another GUR representative, suggested that the composition of the armed group was a sign of an internal struggle within Russia, and characterized the event as a "confrontation within the Russian Federation itself between the citizens of the Russian Federation".

Notes

References

2023 in international relations
Attacks in Europe in 2023
Eastern Ukraine offensive
2023 attack
March 2023 events in Russia
Northeastern Ukraine campaign